Cremastosperma yamayakatense is a species of tropical tree in the "soursop" family Annonaceae that is found in lowland rainforest in the Amazonas Region of northern Peru.

References

Annonaceae
Endemic flora of Peru
Plants described in 2004